Palma or La Palma means palm in a number of languages and may also refer to:

Geography

Africa
Palma, Mozambique, city
Palma District
La Palma, one of the Canary Islands, Spain
La Palma (DO), a Denominación de Origen for wines from the island of La Palma
La Palma Airport

The Americas
Palma, Santa Maria, a district of Rio Grande do Sul, Brazil
Palma, Minas Gerais, a municipality in Brazil
Palma River, Brazil
La Palma, Cundinamarca, a municipality and town in Colombia
La Palma, Cuba, a city
Río de la Palma, a river in Cuba
La Palma, Chalatenango, a municipality of El Salvador
La Palma, Darién, a city of Panama
La Palma, Los Santos, a corregimiento of Panama
La Palma, Arizona, an unincorporated place in the United States
La Palma, California, a city in the United States
La Palma Intercommunity Hospital
La Palma (Mexico City Metrobús), a BRT station in Mexico City

Europe
Palma de Mallorca
Palma di Montechiaro
Bay of Palma, south of Palma, Majorca, Spain
Palma Arena, Palma, Majorca

People
Palma (name)
Dragan Marković (born 1960), Serbian politician and entrepreneur commonly called "Palma"

Other uses
Palma shooting, a shooting sport which is a variant of fullbore target rifle
Battle of Palma, Palma massacre or Palma shooting which took place in Mozambique in 2021
372 Palma, a main-belt asteroid
La Palma (newspaper), a Spanish-language newspaper published by The Palm Beach Post in Florida, United States
Palma High School, a Catholic boys school in Salinas, California, United States
47th Palma Light Infantry Regiment, a military unit of Spain
UB La Palma, a basketball team in Santa Cruz de La Palma, Canary Islands
Palma, an 1804 opera by Friedrich Witt
 Palma, a Spanish name for the marine fish Kyphosus elegans
 Palma, or Palm, a fictional planet in Phantasy Star and Phantasy Star II.

See also
Las Palmas (disambiguation)
Palmar (disambiguation)
Palmas (disambiguation)
Palam